Lorna Doone is a 1922 American silent drama film based upon Richard Doddridge Blackmore's 1869 novel of the same name. Directed by French director Maurice Tourneur in the United States, the film starred Madge Bellamy and John Bowers.

This is one of many film adaptations of the novel. It was filmed twice before in 1912 in England for Clarendon, and in 1915 for the American Biograph Company. Other later adaptations include 1934 and 1951 films, and 1990 and 2001 television movies.

Cast
Madge Bellamy as Lorna Doone
Mae Giraci as Lorna as a Child (credited as Mae Giracci)
John Bowers as John Ridd
Charles Hatton as John as a Child
Frank Keenan as Sir Ensor Doone
Jack McDonald as Counsellor Doone (credited as Jack MacDonald)
Donald McDonald as Carver Doone
Norris Johnson as Ruth, John's Cousin
Gertrude Astor as Countess of Brandir (uncredited)
James Robert Chandler as Frye (uncredited)
Irene De Voss as Lorna's Mother (uncredited)
Joan Standing as Gwenny Carfax (uncredited)

Restoration
In 2001 a digital restoration of the film was financed by Georgia cinephile Jesse Sharp and released on DVD by Kino International. Japanese singer/songwriter Mari Iijima composed an all-new musical score for the film.

Critical reception
In a contemporary review, Variety wrote, "Madge Bellamy has just the right wistful quality of beauty for Lorna...the histrionic honors, however, go to that best of character portrait makers, Frank Keenan, as Sir Ensor Doone...The scenic features of the picture have been splendidly managed. The stagecoach inn might have been lifted from an authentic print of the times. The spirited passage of the coach robbery on the seashore is a smashing bit of pictorial emphasis and the action in the robber's village is scenically impressive."

References

External links

Lorna Doone on IMDb
Review of 2001 Kino DVD Release
IMDb Listing of movies based on Lorna Doone
 

1922 films
Films based on Lorna Doone
Films directed by Maurice Tourneur
American silent feature films
American historical films
1920s historical films
First National Pictures films
American black-and-white films
1920s American films